Egan-Sud is a municipality in the La Vallée-de-la-Gatineau Regional County Municipality, Quebec, Canada, directly north of Maniwaki.

It has a residential, agricultural, and commercial character, the last of which mainly concentrated along Highway 105.

History
Settlement in this area by Europeans began in the mid-nineteenth century. By 1863, there was a population of 140 people, most of Irish origin and almost all Catholics. In 1864, the Egan Township was proclaimed, named in memory of John Egan (1811-1857), an Irish immigrant, owner of large logging concessions in the Outaouais, and holder of several political offices. In 1881, the Municipality Township of Egan was formed, with Patrick Moore as first mayor who served until 1902.

In 1920, Egan Township was split up into the municipalities of Egan-Sud, Bois-Franc, and Montcerf (now Montcerf-Lytton). The first mayor of Egan-Sud was James Millar.

Demographics

The language statistics are as follows (as of the 2006 Census): 89% of Egan-Sud speak French as their first language, 4% speak English as their first language, 3% speak both French and English as a first language and 4% have a different first language.

Local government

List of former mayors:
 James Millar
 David Courtney
 Steven McSheffrey
 William P. McConnery
 Albert Bernatchez (1954–1979)
 René-Guy Moreau (1979–1997)
 Evelyne Hubert (2003–2005)
 Michel Cyr (2005–200?)
 Neil Gagnon (200?–present)

References

External links

 Official website

Incorporated places in Outaouais
Municipalities in Quebec